Doru Toma (born 21 July 1957) is a Romanian former football central midfielder.

Honours
Argeș Pitești
Divizia A: 1978–79
Balkans Cup runner-up: 1987–88, 1984–85

Notes

References

1954 births
Living people
Sportspeople from Pitești
Romanian footballers
Association football midfielders
Liga I players
Liga II players
FC Dacia Pitești players
FC Argeș Pitești players
Chimia Râmnicu Vâlcea players